A Neumann series is a mathematical series of the form

where  is an operator and  its  times repeated application. 
This generalizes the geometric series.

The series is named after the mathematician Carl Neumann, who used it in 1877 in the context of potential theory. The Neumann series is used in functional analysis. It forms the basis of the Liouville-Neumann series, which is used to solve Fredholm integral equations. It is also important when studying the spectrum of bounded operators.

Properties 

Suppose that  is a bounded linear operator on the normed vector space . If the Neumann series converges in the operator norm, then  is invertible and its inverse is the series:
,
To see why, consider the partial sums
.
Then we have

However, there are also results which give weaker conditions under which the series converges.

Example  
Let  be given by:

We need to show that C is smaller than unity in some norm. Therefore, we calculate:

Thus, we know from the statement above that  exists.

Approximate matrix inversion 
A truncated Neumann series can be used for approximate matrix inversion. To approximate the inverse of an invertible matrix , we can assign the linear operator as:
   
where  is the identity matrix.

The set of invertible operators is open 
Indeed, let  be an invertible operator and let  be another operator. 
If , then  is also invertible. 
Since , the Neumann series  is convergent. Therefore, we have
  

Taking the norms, we get
 

The norm of  can be bounded by

Applications 
The Neumann series has been used for linear data detection in massive multiuser multiple-input multiple-output (MIMO) wireless systems. Using a truncated Neumann series avoids computation of an explicit matrix inverse, which reduces the complexity of linear data detection from cubic to square.

Another application is the theory of Propagation graphs which takes advantage of Neumann series to derive closed form expression for the transfer function.

References 

 

Functional analysis
Mathematical series